"The Gift" is the second track that appears on White Light/White Heat, the 1968 second album by the Velvet Underground. The song is over eight minutes long and, in the stereo version, mixed in such a way that a short story can be heard in the left speaker, while a rock instrumental is heard on the right.

Elements

Short story
The short story, recited by a deadpan John Cale, was written by Lou Reed as a writing project during his college days.

The narrative concerns Waldo Jeffers, a lovesick youth, who has engaged in a distressing long-distance relationship with his college girlfriend Marsha Bronson. After their school terms end, Waldo returns to his hometown of Locust, Pennsylvania. He becomes increasingly paranoid over the course of two months, worried that Marsha might not stay faithful to him as promised. More than anything, he fears constantly that she will engage in sexual promiscuity. Lacking the requisite money to visit her in Wisconsin, he concocts a plan to mail himself to her in a large cardboard box, expecting it will be a welcome surprise to Marsha. He ships himself on Friday.

The following Monday, Marsha is having a discussion with her friend Sheila Klein about Bill, a man that Marsha slept with the previous night. When the package arrives at the door, the two struggle to open the box while Waldo waits excitedly inside. Unable to open the box by other means and frustrated, Marsha retrieves a sheet metal cutter from her basement and gives it to Sheila, who stabs straight through the box and right through the center of Waldo's head.

Music
It appears in five versions on the Super Deluxe 45th Anniversary Edition of White Light/White Heat: stereo, mono, vocal only, instrumental only, and live instrumental.

The instrumental track was originally developed from live jams. Contrary to rumor, it is not the same song as "Booker T.", as noted in David Fricke's essay in the 2013 deluxe reissue of White Light/White Heat.

At the urging of Frank Zappa, Reed provided the sound effect of Waldo's head being cut by stabbing a cantaloupe either by using a knife or a wrench.

The remastered version was released on the 1995 Peel Slowly and See box set, and subsequently released on a standalone 1996 CD.

A live version appears on Live MCMXCIII.

The British punk band the Bollock Brothers did a cover version called "The Gift II".

Personnel

 John Cale – spoken word, fuzz bass
 Lou Reed – electric guitar, cantaloupe
 Sterling Morrison – electric guitar
 Maureen Tucker – percussion

References

The Velvet Underground songs
Black comedy music
1968 songs
Songs written by Lou Reed
Song recordings produced by Tom Wilson (record producer)
Songs written by John Cale